The Daniel S. Piper House is a historic farmstead complex in Medford, Minnesota, United States.  Consisting of an interconnected house, summer kitchen, shed, and barn, it is Minnesota's only known surviving example of a property type imported by settlers from New England.  The Piper House complex was built in 1877.  It was listed on the National Register of Historic Places in 1975 for having state-level significance in the themes of agriculture, architecture, and exploration/settlement.  It was nominated for being the only surviving example of a distinctive property type and for being a symbol of Minnesota's many New Englander pioneers.

See also
 National Register of Historic Places listings in Steele County, Minnesota

References

1877 establishments in Minnesota
Barns on the National Register of Historic Places in Minnesota
Greek Revival houses in Minnesota
Houses completed in 1877
Houses in Steele County, Minnesota
Houses on the National Register of Historic Places in Minnesota
Italianate architecture in Minnesota
National Register of Historic Places in Steele County, Minnesota